Alexander Balus (HWV 65) is an oratorio by George Frideric Handel, named after its title character, the Seleucid king Alexander Balas. The work has three acts and was written in English. The period of the story is from 150 B.C to 145 B.C. The libretto is by Thomas Morell after the biblical book of 1 Maccabees.

Fourth in a series of English military oratorios, following Joshua and the success of Judas Maccabaeus, celebrating the victories of the Hanoverian monarchy over the Jacobite uprisings, the work moves from celebrations of military success in the first act to personal tragedies in the last. Alexander Balus was composed in the summer of 1747 and premiered on 23 March 1748 at Covent Garden Theatre, London, with Caterina Galli singing the title role, Thomas Lowe as Jonathan, and Thomas Reinhold as Ptolemee. In 1754 Handel made a revision to his work and changed the leading role, the king Alexander, to a soprano instead of an alto.

Dramatis personae

Synopsis

Act 1

Alexander claimed the throne of Syria by killing Demetrius the king. Alexander then befriends the Jews and their leader Jonathan Maccabaeus. The king of Egypt, Ptolemee, congratulates Alexander and celebrates his successes by awarding him his daughter, Cleopatra Thea (not the famous Cleopatra of Shakespeare and Handel's opera Giulio Cesare). The two fall in love.

Act 2

Alexander and Cleopatra are married. Alexander is led to believe by a messenger that Jonathan plans to betray him after winning his friendship. It is then revealed that Ptolemee only arranged Alexander and Cleopatra's marriage to take Alexander's land and power. He plans to move his troops into Syria under the cover of nightfall to kidnap and kill the young leader.
 
Act 3

Cleopatra is kidnapped by Ptolemee’s ruffians and he intends to force her to marry another man. During Cleopatra's captivity, Ptolemee tries to break her allegiance to Alexander, but is unsuccessful. Alexander rushes off to war, while Jonathan stays behind, fearing the worst and doubting the power of Alexander's Syrian gods. Jonathan's intuition is confirmed when a messenger delivers the news that although they won three battles, Alexander and Ptolemee have been killed. Cleopatra commends herself to the goddess, Isis, and retires to ‘some peaceful shore’. Jonathan reflects on the tragedy, believing that if everyone would have acknowledged the true God, none of this would have happened.

Musical features

Varied and characterful choruses are a feature of the work, the choruses for the Jews being of a serious and contrapuntal quality, in contrast to the simpler, more down to earth and cheerful choruses for the "Asiates". In the massive, complex chorus "O calumny", the chorus comments and moralizes on the action in the manner of choruses in ancient Greek tragedy. The role of Cleopatra is given a series of arias remarkable both for their originality of orchestration and their expressive quality. Her first aria "Hark he strikes the golden lyre" is scored, very unusually, for two flutes, harp and mandolin over a background of pizzicato strings to produce an exotic and exquisite effect. Her final sequence of arias as she hears of her husband's defeat and death and prepares herself for suicide achieve a power and poignancy equal to that in many  more famous operas.

List of musical numbers

Act 1
Orchestra 
Overture

Chorus of Asiates-   
Flushed with conquest, fir’d by Mithra

Alexander-  
Recit.*Thus far ye glorious partners of the war

Jonathan- 	 
Air. Great Author of this harmony 
Recit. And thus let happy Egypt’s king

Ptolemee -
Air. Thrice happy the Monarch, whom nations contend

Cleopatra-	 
Recit. Congratulations to our father’s friend
Air. Hark he strikes the golden lyre

Alexander-	
Recit. Be it my chief ambition there to rise 
Air. Fair virtue shall charm me

Chorus of Asiates-	
Ye happy nations round

Alexander-	
Recit. My Jonathan, didst thou mark
Air. Oh what restless charms

Cleopatra- 	
Air. Subtle Love, with fancy viewing Aspasia, I know not what to call 
Air. How happy should we mortals prove?

Aspasia-		
Recit. Check not the pleasing accent of thy tongue
Air. So shall the sweet attractive smile

Cleopatra- 	
Recit. How blissful state

Ceopatra/Aspasi-	
Duet. O, what pleasures, past expressing

Jonathan- 	 
Recit. Why hangs heavy gloom upon the brow

Alexander-	 
Air. Heroes may boast their mighty deeds
Air. Mighty Love now calls to arm

Jonathan-	
Recit. Ye sons of Judah, with high festivals proclaim 
Air. Great god, from whom all blessings spring

Chorus of Israelites- 	
These are thy gifts, almighty king
To thee let grateful Judah sing

Act 2

Alexander-	
Air. Kind Hope, thou universal friend

Jonathan-	
Recit. Long, long and happy live the king

Alexander-	
Air. O Mithra, with thy brightest beams

Sycophant Courtier-	
Stay my dread sovereign

Jonathan-	
Air. Hateful man!

Chorus- 		
O calumny, on virtue waiting

Cleopatra- 	
Recit. Ah! Whence these dire  forebodings of the mind?
Air. Tost from the thought to thought I rove

Aspasia-		
Recit. Give to the winds, fair princess, these vain doubts
Air. Love, glory, ambition

Ptolomee-	
Recit. Thus far my wishes thrive
Air. Virtue, thou ideal name

Jonathan-	
Recit. Ye happy people

Jonathan and Chorus-		
Triumph, Hymen, in the pair

Alexander-	
Recit. Glad time, at length, has reach’d the happy point

Cleopatra/Alexander- 	
Duet. Hail, wedded love, mysterious lawChorus of Asiates-	
Hymen, fair Urania’s son

Act 3OrchestraSinfoniaCleopatra-	
Recit. Tis true, instructive nature seldom points 
Air. Here amid the shady woodsRuffians/Cleopatra/-	
Recit. Mistaken queen! The Gods and PtolemeeAlexander-	 
Recit. Ah! Was it not my Cleopatra’s voice?
Air. Pow’rful guardians of al natureJonathan-	
Recit. Treach’ry, o kingAlexander-	
Air. Fury, with red sparkling eyesAsparsia-	
Recit. Gods! Can there be a more afflicting sight
Air. Strange reverse of human fateJonathan-	
Air. The God, who made the radiant sunChorus of Issaelites- 	
Sun, moon, and starsPtolomee- 	
Recit. Yes he was false, my daughter 
Air. O sword, and thou all-daring handCleopatra-	
Recit. Shall Cleopatra ever smile again?Messenger-	
Ungrateful tidings to the royal earCleopatra-	
Air. O take me from this hateful lightAnother  Messenger-	
Forgive, o queen, the messenger of illCleopatra-	
Recit. Calm thy soul, kind Isis 
Air. Convey me to some peaceful shoreJonathan-	
Recit. Mysterious are thy ways, o providenceJonathan and Chorus-'  	
Ye servants of th’ eternal King

Instrumentation
The work is scored for strings, two oboes, two trumpets, two horns, bassoon, two flutes, harp, mandolin, and continuo.

Recording
With Lynne Dawson soprano, Michael George bass, Catherine Denley alto, Charles Daniels tenor, Claron McFadden soprano, The King's Consort, Choir of The King's Consort, New College Choir, Oxford, Robert King. Release date 2010.
Hyperion CD:CDA67241/2

References

External links
 Alexander Balus information at gfhandel.org.
 Full-text libretto hosted by Stanford University.
 Score of Alexander Balus'' (ed. Friedrich Chrysander, Leipzig 1870)

Oratorios by George Frideric Handel
1747 compositions
Oratorios based on the Bible